Backline may refer to:
Backline (football), position in Australian rules football and rugby
Backline (stage), instruments and amplifiers at the back of a stage